Mugur Sundar is a dance choreographer in South Indian cinema.

Early life

Sundar was born in Mugur, a village located in Mysore district, Karnataka. He has three sons, Prabhu Deva, Raju Sundaram and Nagendra Prasad, who are established dance masters and have also worked in Kollywood films. All the three are distinct actors also and Prabhudeva is currently a successful Director as well.

Career

He worked in Chandamama Press in Chennai for a salary of Rs.40 per month. He learnt dancing by paying Rs.10. In 1962 he got a chance to be a group dancer in the movie Konjum Salangai. He worked as assistant to Thangappan master for four years. He has worked in Tamil cinema in his over four decade long career. He joined the film industry in the late 1970s and is quite active since the early 1980s. He was a busy choreographer in the 1980s and has worked with almost all leading actors since the early 1980s. Aarada Gaaya released in 1980 is one of his earliest credited works. It was followed by Preethisi Nodu, Prachanda Putanigalu, Anupama, Nee Nanna Gellalare, Keralida Simha are some of his early works. He was active in the film industry till the mid-2000s. He choreographed for about 1000 movies, in a career spanning to about three decades.

Other roles

In 2001, he directed his first Kannada film Manasella Neene, a remake of Telugu film Manasantha Nuvve. his son Nagendra Prasad played a lead role in the film.
 
Sundar played a guest role in a Kannada film Thabbali (2009) and also later in Jani (2017) and he choreographed a song for the former film. He portrayed lead role in a Tamil film called Pa. Ra. Palanisamy (2010).

Television

He was One of the judges in the famous Dance show AATA 4 which is telecast on Zee Telugu, a Telugu channel. Sundaram donned the role of a judge on Vijay TV's popular show Jodi No.1, Jodi No.1 Season Two where the participants are television artistes. His fellow judges were Silambarasan and Sangeetha.

Filmography

Awards
National Film Awards
He Won the National Film Award for Best Choreography for his work In the movie Thiruda Thiruda in 1993.

Filmfare Awards South
Filmfare Lifetime Achievement Award – South (1999)

Nandi Awards
 Best Choreographer - Geethanjali (1989)
 Best Choreographer - Jagadeka Veerudu Athiloka Sundari (1990)

Vijay Awards
Vijay Award for Contribution to Tamil Cinema in 2010.

References

Kannada film directors
Indian male film actors
Indian film choreographers
Living people
Male actors from Mysore
Dancers from Karnataka
Artists from Mysore
Film people from Karnataka
20th-century Indian dancers
1938 births
Best Choreography National Film Award winners